Tōkai Kisen is a shipping company headquartered in 1-16-1, Kaigan, Minato, Tokyo, Japan (〒105-6891
東京都港区海岸一丁目16番1号). Its main business is freight and passenger transportation between the main island of Honshu and the Izu Islands in the Pacific Ocean. The company is listed on the Second Floor of the Tokyo Stock Exchange.

In general
Tōkai Kisen started its shipping business in 1889 as Tōkyo Bay Ships, combining four smaller shipping businesses, with twenty one ships and a total of 1.616 gross tons. In the following year, it was established as an incorporated company.

It soon added Hokkaido and Northeast Japan businesses, but later abandoned them. In 1942, it changed its name to the current name, Tōkai Kisen, which means East Sea Ships.

During the financially difficult time right after the Second World War, the company accepted investment from Fujita Kanko (Japanese: 藤田観光), one of the leaders in the hospitality industry, which has remained its largest shareholder with twenty percent of the company stock. It soon followed its expansion plans.

In 1969, Tōkai Kisen established Ogasawara Ocean Transport, a joint business with Kinkai Yusen, but now a Nippon Yusen's sibsidiary. In 1981, it established Seven-Islands-of-Izu Ocean Transport. In 1988, Tokyo Vingt-et-Un Cruise was added to the group. In 2003, it bought Ōshima Passenger Cars, mainly a bus operator on Izu Ōshima.

Since 2003, the company has put a few high-speed Jetfoils into service for ferrying passengers to and from the Izu Islands. It also operates the Oshima Hot Spring Hotel on Izu Oshima.

In December 1986, Tōkai Kisen helped the evacuation of all residents of Izu Ōshima during the large-scale volcanic eruption of Mount Mihara, cancelling the company's all other lines.

The company is listed on the Second Floor of the Tokyo Stock Exchange since 1949.

Since 2019, Keihin Kyuko Electric Railway has acquired a 0.23% stake in this ferry company. And, Fujikyu has made a 0.02% investment in this ferry company.

Gallery

Subsidiary companies

Oshima Bus

The  is a bus company, and it was invested by the Tōkai Kisen (Dowa Group), and established on 1 September 2003.
Oshima Bus have a head office and barn that are located 1-9-6 Motomachi, Oshima, Tokyo, Japan.

Outline
This company was established in 1931 as Shimoda Car Corporation Oshima Office. On 11 November 1932, Tōkai Bus merged to Shimoda Car and then Oshima Office started to belong to Tokai Bus. In July 1933, Oshima Office was transferred to Oshima Car LLC. In July 1949, Tokai Kisen merged to Oshima Kaihatsu which was originated from Oshima Car. On 1 September 2003, a bus department demerged from Tokai Kisen and established Oshima BUs.

Offices
Oshima Office
It is located near the company head office
Tokyo Office
It is located in the head office of Tokai Kisen on 1-16-1, Kaigan, Minato, Tokyo

Bus route
All bus routes run on Oshima.

There aren't services which run from Gojinka Onsen to Port of Motomachi. But there are services which run from Port of Motomachi to Gojinka Onsen when passengers implore drivers to stop at Gojinka Onsen.

Rolling stocks

References

External links

Official site
Oshima Bus Official website
Oshima Bus Official twitter

Shipping companies of Japan
Companies listed on the Tokyo Stock Exchange
Companies based in Tokyo
Hotel affiliation groups